The women's freestyle 57 kg freestyle wrestling competition at the 2018 Commonwealth Games in Gold Coast, Australia was held on 13 April 2018 at the Carrara Sports and Leisure Centre.

Results
Legend
F — Won by fall

Elimination groups

Group A

Group B

Knockout round

References

Wrestling at the 2018 Commonwealth Games
Com